Death Scenes is a 1989 mondo film starring Church of Satan founder Anton LaVey and directed by Nick Bougas.

Overview
Satanist Anton Lavey hosts this morbid mondo documentary about death.

Sequels
The film was followed by two sequels, Death Scenes 2 from 1992 and Death Scenes 3 from 1993.

Death Scenes 2 provides an inside look at the history of death, particularly war between the United States and other foreign conflicts. A short introduction of the horrors of war begins with the ideological findings from Ernst Friedrich (1894-1967). Friedrich was a German pacifist who wrote and published a book called War Against War. The film says that in 1924, he founded the National Anti-War Museum in Berlin, where a radical new method of protest was born. To illustrate his point of view on war, Friedrich quickly displayed hundreds of disturbing photographs which fully revealed the hidden horrors of World War One.

Next the film settles in a more national concern dealing with death: the mafia and urban gang violence. Going back to the 1920s and into the present day, some notable mentions in this chapter include Murder, Inc. from the 1940s and 50s. Photos of the murders taken place at the gang-run barber shop is shown, including the body of Albert Anastasia (1902-1957), a notorious New York gangster. Another national historic event talked about in the film is acts of political violence, briefly mentioning the 1950 assassination attempt of President Harry S. Truman and the 1954 US Capitol shooting.

The film goes into the "restless sixties," showing the graphic assassination of John F. Kennedy, both in pictures and in the notorious Zapruder film. With many death-related events that occurred during this period, footage from the deadly "Long Hot Summer of 1967" riots proved that the sixties were indeed a hard time.

See also
 Faces of Death

References

External links

Mondo films
American independent films
1989 films
American documentary films
1989 documentary films
Films directed by Nick Bougas
1980s English-language films
1980s American films